Psalidocyon is an extinct genus of  the Borophaginae subfamily of canids native to North America. Only one species is currently recognised. It was initially found on Skull Ridge, Tesuque, New Mexico. A member of the Borophagini tribe, it was an intermediate-sized canid, with specialisations towards a heavily meat-based diet.

Sources

Borophagines
Miocene canids
Serravallian extinctions
Prehistoric mammals of North America
Prehistoric carnivoran genera
Burdigalian first appearances